Agata Jadwiga Karczmarek (née Jaroszek; 29 November 1963 – 18 July 2016) was a Polish gymnast and long jumper.

Her most successful contest was in 1997 when she won a bronze medal at the 1997 IAAF World Indoor Championships. Her personal best jump was 6.97m, set in Lublin 1988. It is still unbeaten national record. She retired after the 2000 season. Karczmarek started her career as a gymnast, competing for Poland at the 1980 Summer Olympics in Moscow. She was once married to hurdler Piotr Karczmarek; their daughter, Zuzanna, was also an athlete.

Athletics international competitions

See also
 Polish records in athletics

References

External links
 
 
 
 
 

1963 births
2016 deaths
Polish female artistic gymnasts
Polish female long jumpers
Olympic gymnasts of Poland
Olympic athletes of Poland
Gymnasts at the 1980 Summer Olympics
Athletes (track and field) at the 1988 Summer Olympics
Athletes (track and field) at the 1992 Summer Olympics
Athletes (track and field) at the 1996 Summer Olympics
Athletes from Warsaw
Legia Warsaw athletes